Pál Titkos (8 January 1908 – 8 October 1988) was a Hungarian footballer. He played for MTK Hungária FC and the Hungary national football team. He scored two goals in the 1938 FIFA World Cup, including one in the final itself.

He coached MTK Budapest FC and Egypt.

Honours

Player
Hungary
 FIFA World Cup: Runners-up 1938

Head coach
Egypt
 Africa Cup of Nations: 1959

References

Hungarian footballers
Hungary international footballers
Hungarian football managers
Hungarian expatriate football managers
MTK Budapest FC players
MTK Budapest FC managers
Egypt national football team managers
Expatriate football managers in Egypt
1938 FIFA World Cup players
1908 births
1988 deaths
1959 African Cup of Nations managers
Association football forwards
Al Ahly SC managers
Zalaegerszegi TE managers
Nemzeti Bajnokság I managers
Hungarian expatriate sportspeople in Egypt
Footballers from Budapest